Marcello Pittella (born 4 June 1962) is an Italian politician. He has served as President of the Basilicata region from 2013 to 2019. He was formerly a member of the Democratic Party (PD), but is now associated with Carlo Calenda's Action party.

Career
Born in Lauria, Pittella's father Domenico and brother Gianni were also politicians. Marcello the mayor of Lauria from 2001 to 2005. in April 2005, he was elected to the Basilicata Regional Council and re-elected in 2010. He joined the Basilicata's Regional Government in 2012 as Assessor to productive activity. He was the Vice President from April 2013 to September 2013. On 8 November 2013 he was elected President of Basilicata, succeeding Vito De Filippo.

In January 2015, due to the illicit repayments obtained between 2009 and 2010, Pitella was condemned by the Court of Accounts of Potenza to "compensate the damage produced to the Basilicata Region" for the amount of 6,319.84 euros.

On 6 July 2018, he ended up under house arrest as a result of an investigation by the Guardia di Finanza regarding rigged competitions and piloted appointments in the Lucanian health service, so he was suspended from the office of President pending final judgment as result of the Severino Law. On 24 September he was released but the GIP ordered the interdiction of residence in Potenza, that was revoked by the GUP on 30 January 2019, following his resignation as President of the Basilicata Region presented on 24 January 2019.

In the 2019 regional election of Basilicata, Pittella was re-elected regional councillor among the ranks of the civic list "Avanti Basilicata".

References

1962 births
Living people
People from Lauria
Italian Socialist Party politicians
Labour Federation (Italy) politicians
Democratic Party (Italy) politicians
Democrats of the Left politicians
Presidents of Basilicata
Heads of government who were later imprisoned